Edin Ferizović (born 12 October 1977) is a Serbian retired footballer who played as a defender.

Club career
Born in Novi Pazar, Ferizović began his career in his native Serbia playing for FK Novi Pazar in Serbian First League. Season 2002/04 he moved to FK Belasica and played in First Macedonian Football League. Early in 2004 he moved back in to FK Novi Pazar and played in Serbian First League. He was half year on loan in OFK Niš. Early in 2007 he signed for ČSK Pivara. After ČSK Čelarevo he moved back again to FK Novi Pazar and played again in Serbian First League. Season 2008/09 he signed for Apolonia Fier and played in Albanian Superliga. He moved even to KF Shkumbini and Besa Kavajë season 2010/11. In summer 2011 he moved back to FK Novi Pazar plays for first time in Serbian SuperLiga. He made his debut in Serbian SuperLiga playing against FK Sloboda Point Sevojno. Early 2012 he was out on loan to FK Sinđelić Niš and played in Serbian First League.

Honours
Besa Kavajë
Albanian Cup: 2010

References

External links
 Edin Ferizović at Srbijafudbal.net

1977 births
Living people
Sportspeople from Novi Pazar
Bosniaks of Serbia
Association football defenders
Serbia and Montenegro footballers
Serbian footballers
FK Novi Pazar players
FK Belasica players
OFK Niš players
FK ČSK Čelarevo players
KF Apolonia Fier players
KS Shkumbini Peqin players
Besa Kavajë players
FK Sinđelić Niš players
FK Tutin players
First League of Serbia and Montenegro players
Macedonian First Football League players
Serbian First League players
Kategoria Superiore players
Serbian SuperLiga players
Serbia and Montenegro expatriate footballers
Expatriate footballers in North Macedonia
Serbia and Montenegro expatriate sportspeople in North Macedonia
Serbian expatriate footballers
Expatriate footballers in Albania
Serbian expatriate sportspeople in Albania